Cyrille Mangan (born 13 September 1976) is a Cameroonian former professional footballer who played as a midfielder.

Mangan played for Skoda Xanthi F.C. in the Greek Alpha Ethniki from 1996 to 1999. He suffered a serious knee injury at the age of 22 years, but recovered and later played for Trikala F.C. in the Greek Gamma Ethniki and Panegialios F.C. in the Greek Beta Ethniki.

Mangan played for the Cameroon national football team in the 1998 African Cup of Nations finals. and in 1998 FIFA World Cup qualifying.

References

External links

Living people
1976 births
Association football midfielders
Cameroonian footballers
Cameroon international footballers
1998 African Cup of Nations players
Xanthi F.C. players
Trikala F.C. players
Panegialios F.C. players